Seh Daran (also Romanized as Seh Darān; also known as Seh Darūn) is a village in Deh Bakri Rural District, in the Central District of Bam County, Kerman Province, Iran. At the 2006 census, its population was 31, in 8 families.

References 

Populated places in Bam County